Gaetano Salvemini (10 September 1873 – 6 September 1957) was an Italian Socialist and antifascist politician, historian and writer. Born in a family of modest means, he became an acclaimed historian both in Italy and abroad, particularly in the United States, after he was forced into exile by Mussolini's fascist regime.

Initially engaging with the Italian Socialist Party, he later adhered to an independent humanitarian socialism and maintained a commitment to radical political and social reform throughout his life. Salvemini offered significant leadership to political refugees in the United States. His prolific writings shaped the attitudes of American policymakers during and after the Second World War. His transatlantic exile experience endowed him with new insights and a fresh perspective to explain the rise of fascism and shaped the memory of the war and political life in Italy after 1945.

He advocated a third way between Communists and Christian Democracy in postwar Italy.

Early life and career 
Salvemini was born in the town of Molfetta, Apulia, in the poor south of Italy, in an extended family of farmers and fishermen of modest means. His father, Ilarione Salvemini, was a carabiniere and part-time teacher. He had been a radical republican who had fought as a Red Shirt following Giuseppe Garibaldi in his fight for Italian unification. His mother Emanuela (née Turtur) was a socialist. His parents' political leanings, as well as the poverty of the region, shaped his own political and social ideals throughout his life.

He was admitted at the University of Florence, where he met mostly students of northern Italy and engaged with young socialists who introduced him to Marxism (which he would revise critically later), the ideas of Carlo Cattaneo and the Italian socialist Filippo Turati's journal Critica Sociale, as well as his first wife Maria Minervini. After completing his studies in Florence in 1894, his historical studies on medieval Florence, the French Revolution and Giuseppe Mazzini established him as an acclaimed historian.

In 1901, after years of teaching in secondary schools, he was appointed as a professor in medieval and modern history at the University of Messina. While in Messina, he lost his wife, five children and his sister in the devastating 1908 Messina earthquake before his eyes, while hiding under an architrave of a window; an experience that shaped his life. "I am a miserable wretch, without home or hearth, who has seen the happiness of eleven years destroyed in two minutes," he wrote. He went on to teach history at the University of Pisa and in 1916 was appointed Professor of Modern History at the University of Florence. Over the years, he aligned with the economist Luigi Einaudi and gradually developed a pragmatic inquiry and inductive analysis, which he called concretismo – a combination of secular values from the enlightenment, liberalism and socialism – in contrast to more philosophical thinkers like the liberal Benedetto Croce and the marxist Antonio Gramsci.

Engaging with socialism 

Salvemini became increasingly concerned with Italian politics and adhered to the Italian Socialist Party (PSI). In 1910, he published an article in the socialist newspaper Avanti!, 'The Minister of the Underworld' (Il ministro della malavita), in which he attacked the power system and political machine of the liberal Prime Minister Giovanni Giolitti, who dominated Italian political life in the early 20th century. Salvemini reproached Giolitti for exploiting the backwardness of Southern Italy for short-term political goals by appeasing the landlords while engaging with corrupt political go-betweens with ties to the underworld. According to Salvemini, Giolitti exploited "the miserable conditions of the Mezzogiorno in order to link the mass of southern deputies to himself".

He opposed the costly military campaign in Libya during Italo-Turkish War (1911–1912). He thought that the war did not meet the real needs of the country in need of far-reaching economic and social reforms but was a dangerous collusion between unrealistic nationalism and corporate interests. In 1911, Salvemini left the PSI because of the "silence and indifference" on the war by the party, and he founded the weekly political review L'Unità, which serve as the voice of militant democrats in Italy for the next decade. He criticised the government's imperial designs in Africa as chauvinist foolishness.

However, he favoured Italy's entry in the First World War on the side of the Entente to achieve a greater political, economic, and social stake in the nation by the masses as well as national self-determination. He became one of the leaders of the democratic interventionists with Leonida Bissolati. Through the fight for democracy abroad, he believed, Italy would rediscover its own democratic roots. Consistently with his interventionist position, he joined as a volunteer in the first two years of the war.

As a member of the PSI, he fought for universal suffrage and the moral and economic rebirth of Italy's Mezzogiorno (Southern Italy) and against corruption in politics. As a meridionalist, he criticised the PSI for its indifference for the problems of Southern Italy. He abandoned the Socialist Party to adhere to an independent humanitarian socialism, but he maintained a commitment to radical reform throughout his life. Elected on a list of ex-combatants, he served in the Italian Chamber of Deputies as an independent radical from 1919 to 1921 during the revolutionary period of the Biennio Rosso. He supported the internationalist programme of self-determination of US President Woodrow Wilson, which envisioned a readjustment of the frontiers of Italy along clearly-recognisable lines of nationality, in contrast to the irredentist policy of Foreign Minister Sidney Sonnino.

Resisting fascism 

In the immediate postwar period, Salvemini was initially silent about Italian fascism, but as a deputy, he soon dissented from the political line of its parliamentary group and started a lively polemic against Benito Mussolini, whom he had admired as socialist leader, to the point that Mussolini even challenged him to a duel, which never took place. Nevertheless, as late as 1922, he considered the fascist movement too small to be a serious political challenge. Salvemini was more opposed to old-style politicians like Giolitti. "A return to Giolitti would be a moral disaster for the whole country," he wrote. "Mussolini was able to carry out his coup.... because everybody was disgusted by the Chamber."

While in Paris, he was surprised by Mussolini's March on Rome in October 1922, which initiated the fascist take over of Italy. In 1923, he held a series of lectures on Italian foreign policy in London to the ire of the fascist government and Florentine fascists. The walls of Florence were plastered with posters saying, "The monkey from Molfetta should not return to Italy". Instead, Salvemini not only returned home but also resumed his lectures at the University, regardless of the threat of fascist students. He joined the opposition after the murder of the socialist politician Giacomo Matteotti on 10 June 1924, when it became clear that Mussolini wanted to establish a one-party dictatorship.

He worked to maintain a strong network of contacts among antifascist intellectuals throughout Italy while much of the Italian academic world bowed to the regime. With his former students and followers Ernesto Rossi and Carlo Rosselli, he founded the first clandestine antifascist newspaper Non mollare (it) ("Don't Give Up") in January 1925. A half year later he was arrested and put on trial but was released on a technicality although he was kept under surveillance. Threats against his life were published in the fascist press, and his lawyer was beaten to death by fascist blackshirts. His name was on top of the list of the fascist death squads during raids on 4 October 1925 in Florence. However, Salvemini had fled to France in August 1925. He was dismissed from the University of Florence, and his Italian citizenship was revoked in 1926.

In exile, Salvemini continued to actively organize resistance against Mussolini in France, England, and finally the United States. In 1927, he published The Fascist Dictatorship in Italy, a lucid and groundbreaking study of the rise of fascism and Mussolini. In Paris he was involved with the founding of Concentrazione antifascista in 1927 and Giustizia e Libertà with Carlo and Nello Rosselli in 1929. Through those organizations, Italian exiles were helping the antifascists in Italy and spreading clandestine newspapers. The movement intended to be a third alternative between fascism and communism, pursuing a free democratic republic based on social justice.

United States 
Salvemini first toured the United States in January 1927 and lectured with a clear antifascist agenda. His lectures were disturbed by fascist foes. His forced exile nevertheless gave him a "sense of freedom, of spiritual independence." Rather than "exile" or "refugee," he preferred the term fuoruscito, an originally-contemptuous label employed by Fascists thar was adopted as a symbol of honour by political exiles from Italy, "a man who has chosen to leave his country to continue a resistance which had become impossible at home". He published The Fascist Dictatorship in Italy (1927), contradicting the widely held belief that Mussolini had saved Italy from Bolshevism.

In 1934, Salvemini accepted a position created especially for him, to teach Italian civilization at Harvard University, where he would remain until 1948. Together with Roberto Bolaffio he founded a North American chapter of Giustizia e Libertà. He wrote articles in important journals like Foreign Affairs and travelled around the country to warn American public opinion against the dangers of fascism. Alarmed by the outbreak of the Second World War after Hitler’s invasion of Poland in September 1939, he and other Italian exiles founded the antifascist Mazzini Society in Northampton, Massachusetts. Salvemini joined the Italian Emergency Rescue Committee (IERC), which raised money for Italian political refugees and worked to convince American authorities to admit them.

He obtained US citizenship in 1940 in the belief of having greater opportunity to influence US policies toward Italy. In fact, government agencies like the State Department and the Federal Bureau of Investigation (FBI) solicited his advice on fascism and Italian matters in general. Notable writings of the American years include Under the Axe of Fascism (1936). As an intellectual, Salvemini left an undeniable mark on the study of Italian history at Harvard and other universities by changing their original focus on language, art, and literature to a critical and systematic study into modern Italy.

The increasing prominence of Max Ascoli, Carlo Sforza, and Alberto Tarchiani in the Mazzini Society consequently led to the progressive distancing of Salvemini from active decision making. Salvemini's fear was that Roosevelt would give Churchill and his conservative agenda a free hand in postwar Italy that would benefit the monarchy and those who had collaborated with Mussolini. After Mussolini's fall in July 1943, Salvemini became increasingly concerned that the Allies and Italian moderates favoured a conservative restoration in Italy. To provide an alternative, together with Harvard professor Giorgio La Piana, Salvemini authored What to do with Italy?, in which they sketched a plan for the postwar reconstruction of Italy with a republican and social democratic programme.

Salvemini was also a familiar figure in the younger years of Arthur Schlesinger Jr., editor of the campaign speeches for peace strategy then known as The New Frontier for John F. Kennedy.

Back in Italy 
Although a US citizen, he returned to Italy in 1948 and was reinstated to his old post as Professor of Modern History at the University of Florence. After 20 years of exile, he started his first speech at his old university with "As we were saying in the last lecture". As a left-leaning republican, he was disappointed with the victory of the Christian Democratic party in the 1948 general election in Italy and the influence of the Catholic Church in the country. Salvemini hoped that the Action Party, a post-war political party that emerged from Giustizia e Libertà, could provide a third force, a socialist-republican coalition uniting reformist socialists and genuine democrats as an alternative for the Communists and the Christian Democrats. However, his hopes for a new Italy declined with the restoration of old attitudes and institutions with the start of the Cold War.

In 1953, his last major historic study, Prelude to World War II, was published about the Second Italo-Ethiopian War. As a historian, he wrote mainly about recent and contemporary history, but he was also noted for his studies of the medieval Italian commune. His The French Revolution: 1788–1792 is an outstanding explanation of the social, political and philosophical currents (and monarchical incompetence) that led to that cataclysm.

Death and legacy 
Salvemini spent the last period of his life in Sorrento and never ceased to denounce the ancient Italian evils: inefficiency, scandals and the lengthy justicial procedures that continued to favour the powerful. He lamented the public schools, which he considered not to be forming a real critical conscience. After a long illness, he died on 6 September 1957, at the age of 83.

Salvemini was among the first and most effective opponents of fascism. The political culture that he embodied made that, according to his biographer, Charles L. Killinger, "the Fascists were anti-Salvemini before he became anti-Fascist, and their efforts to silence him made his name synonymous with early Italian resistance to the new regime." Although a prolific historian, he was not the kind of person to separate scholarship from political activity. Throughout his exile, he actively organized resistance to Mussolini, assisting others in escaping Italy, and he played an important role in spurring both elite and public opinion in America against the fascist regime.

Giolitti's biographer, Alexander De Grand, describes his subject's foe as a "major historian, driven by an austere moralism" and as a "difficult man who attracted deep attachments and bitter enmity", who "constantly sought to turn his ideas into practical policy, yet he was a mediocre – no, terrible – politician," quoting Salvemini's fellow exile Max Ascoli who described him "as the greatest enemy of politics of all the men I have known". Nevertheless, Salvemini was an imperative force who left a permanent mark on Italian politics and historiography. As a party activist, political commentator and public officeholder, he championed social and political reform, and his name is tantamount to early Italian resistance to the new fascist regime. Salvemini said several times that he always tried to live by the principle: "Do what you have to do, come what may" (Fà quello che devi, avvenga quello che può).

References 
Notes

Sources
 Camera dei deputati, Portale storico, Gaetano Salvemini
 Carnes, Mark C. (ed.) (2005). American National Biography: Supplement 2, New York: Oxford University Press, 
 Clark, Martin (1984/2014). Modern Italy, 1871 to the Present, New York: Routledge, 
 De Grand, Alexander J. (2001). The hunchback's tailor: Giovanni Giolitti and liberal Italy from the challenge of mass politics to the rise of fascism, 1882-1922, Wesport/London: Praeger,  online edition
 Duggan, Christopher (2008). The Force of Destiny: A History of Italy Since 1796, Houghton Mifflin Harcourt, 
 Killinger, Charles L. (2002). Gaetano Salvemini: a biography, Westport: Praeger,  (Review)
 Paoli, Letizia (2003). Broken bonds: Mafia and politics in Sicily, in: Godson, Roy (ed.) (2004). Menace to Society: Political-criminal Collaboration Around the World, New Brunswick/London: Transaction Publishers, 
 Pugliese, Stanislao G. (1999). Carlo Rosselli: Socialist Heretic and Antifascist Exile, Cambridge (MA)/London: Harvard University Press, 
 
 Rose, Peter Isaac (2005). The Dispossessed: An Anatomy of Exile, Amherst/Boston: University of Massachusetts Press, 
 Sarti, Roland (2004). Italy: a reference guide from the Renaissance to the present, New York: Facts on File Inc., 

1873 births
1957 deaths
People from Molfetta
Italian Socialist Party politicians
Action Party (Italy) politicians
Deputies of Legislature XXV of the Kingdom of Italy
Politicians of Apulia
Manifesto of the Anti-Fascist Intellectuals
Italian anti-fascists
20th-century Italian historians
Italian emigrants to the United States
Italian male non-fiction writers
Italian socialists
Academic staff of the University of Messina
Academic staff of the University of Pisa
Academic staff of the University of Florence
Harvard University staff
Corresponding Fellows of the Medieval Academy of America
Members of Giustizia e Libertà
Exiled Italian politicians
Victims of the 1908 Messina earthquake